"Be the Man" (also titled "Be the Man (On This Night)") is a pop song by Canadian singer Celine Dion, recorded for her fifth English-language studio album, Let's Talk About Love (1997). It was written by Junior Miles and its producer David Foster, and released as the second single from the album in Japan on 13 November 1997 by Columbia Records. "Be the Man" also served as the theme song to the Japanese television drama, Eve - Santa Claus Dreaming and was included on its soundtrack in 1997. The song was recorded in two versions, English and Japanese.

Background and release
No music video was made.

"Be the Man" reached number 24 on the Oricon Singles Chart and was certified platinum (100,000).

The song became also a B-side to "The Reason" single, released at the same time in parts of Europe.

"Be the Man" was not available on editions of Let's Talk About Love released in the Americas.

The English version of this song was included later on the Japanese edition of Dion's 1999 greatest hits All the Way… A Decade of Song and the 2008 Japan only released Complete Best. The Japanese version of "Be the Man" became available worldwide on The Collector's Series, Volume One in 2000.

Formats and track listings
Japanese 3" CD single
"Be the Man" – 4:41
"Be the Man" (Japanese Version) – 4:42
"Be the Man" (Karaoke Version) – 4:41

Charts

Certifications and sales

Release history

References

1997 singles
1997 songs
1990s ballads
Celine Dion songs
Columbia Records singles
Epic Records singles
Pop ballads
Songs written by David Foster
Song recordings produced by David Foster